Haussmann's renovation of Paris was a vast public works programme commissioned by Emperor Napoleon III and directed by his prefect of Seine, Georges-Eugène Haussmann, between 1853 and 1870. It included the demolition of medieval neighbourhoods that were deemed overcrowded and unhealthy by officials at the time; the building of wide avenues; new parks and squares; the annexation of the suburbs surrounding Paris; and the construction of new sewers, fountains and aqueducts. Haussmann's work was met with fierce opposition, and he was finally dismissed by Napoleon III in 1870; but work on his projects continued until 1927. The street plan and distinctive appearance of the centre of Paris today are largely the result of Haussmann's renovation.

Background

Overcrowding, disease, crime and unrest in the centre of the old Paris 

In the middle of the 19th century, the centre of Paris was viewed as overcrowded, dark, dangerous, and unhealthy. In 1845, the French social reformer Victor Considerant wrote: "Paris is an immense workshop of putrefaction, where misery, pestilence and sickness work in concert, where sunlight and air rarely penetrate. Paris is a terrible place where plants shrivel and perish, and where, of seven small infants, four die during the course of the year." The street plan on the Île de la Cité and in the neighbourhood called the "quartier des Arcis", between the Louvre and the "Hôtel de Ville" (City Hall), had changed little since the Middle Ages. The population density in these neighbourhoods was extremely high, compared with the rest of Paris; in the neighbourhood of Champs-Élysées, population density was estimated at 5,380 per square kilometre (22 per acre); in the neighbourhoods of Arcis and Saint-Avoye, located in the present Third Arrondissement, there was one inhabitant for every three square metres (32 sq ft). In 1840, a doctor described one building in the Île de la Cité where a single 5-square-metre room (54 sq ft) on the fourth floor was occupied by twenty-three people, both adults and children. In these conditions, disease spread very quickly. Cholera epidemics ravaged the city in 1832 and 1848. In the epidemic of 1848, five percent of the inhabitants of these two neighbourhoods died.

Traffic circulation was another major problem. The widest streets in these two neighborhoods were only five metres (16 feet) wide; the narrowest were one or two meters (3–7 feet) wide. Wagons, carriages and carts could barely move through the streets.

The centre of the city was also a cradle of discontent and revolution; between 1830 and 1848, seven armed uprisings and revolts had broken out in the centre of Paris, particularly along the Faubourg Saint-Antoine, around the Hôtel de Ville, and around Montagne Sainte-Geneviève on the left bank. The residents of these neighbourhoods had taken up pavement stones and blocked the narrow streets with barricades, which had to be dislodged by the army.

Earlier attempts to modernize the city 

The urban problems of Paris had been recognized in the 18th century; Voltaire complained about the markets "established in narrow streets, showing off their filthiness, spreading infection and causing continuing disorders." He wrote that the façade of the Louvre was admirable, "but it was hidden behind buildings worthy of the Goths and Vandals." He protested that the government "invested in futilities rather than investing in public works." In 1739 he wrote to the King of Prussia: "I saw the fireworks which they fired off with such management; would rather they started to have a Hôtel de Ville, beautiful squares, magnificent and convenient markets, beautiful fountains, before having fireworks."

The 18th century architectural theorist and historian Quatremere de Quincy had proposed establishing or widening public squares in each of the neighbourhoods, expanding and developing the squares in front the Cathedral of Nôtre Dame and the church of Saint Gervais, and building a wide street to connect the Louvre with the Hôtel de Ville, the new city hall. Moreau, the architect in chief of Paris, suggested paving and developing the embankments of the Seine, building monumental squares, clearing the space around landmarks, and cutting new streets. In 1794, during the French Revolution, a Commission of Artists drafted an ambitious plan to build wide avenues, including a street in a straight line from the Place de la Nation to the Louvre, where the Avenue Victoria is today, and squares with avenues radiating in different directions, largely making use of land confiscated from the church during the Revolution, but all of these projects remained on paper.

Napoleon Bonaparte also had ambitious plans for rebuilding the city. He began work on a canal to bring fresh water to the city and began work on the Rue de Rivoli, beginning at the Place de la Concorde, but was able to extend it only to the Louvre before his downfall. "If only the heavens had given me twenty more years of rule and a little leisure," he wrote while in exile on Saint Helena, "one would vainly search today for the old Paris; nothing would remain of it but vestiges."

The medieval core and plan of Paris changed little during the restoration of the monarchy through the reign of King Louis-Philippe (1830–1848). It was the Paris of the narrow and winding streets and foul sewers described in the novels of Balzac and Victor Hugo. In 1833, the new prefect of the Seine under Louis-Philippe, Claude-Philibert Barthelot, comte de Rambuteau, made modest improvements to the sanitation and circulation of the city. He constructed new sewers, though they still emptied directly into the Seine, and a better water supply system. He constructed 180 kilometres of sidewalks, a new street, rue Lobau; a new bridge over the Seine, the pont Louis-Philippe; and cleared an open space around the Hôtel de Ville. He built a new street the length of the Île de la Cité and three additional streets across it: rue d'Arcole, rue de la Cité and rue Constantine. To access the central market at Les Halles, he built a wide new street (today's rue Rambuteau) and began work on the Boulevard Malesherbes. On the Left Bank, he built a new street, rue Soufflot, which cleared space around the Panthéon, and began work on the rue des Écoles, between the École Polytechnique and the Collège de France.

Rambuteau wanted to do more, but his budget and powers were limited. He did not have the power to easily expropriate property to build new streets, and the first law which required minimum health standards for Paris residential buildings was not passed until April 1850, under Louis-Napoléon Bonaparte, then president of the Second French Republic.

Louis-Napoléon Bonaparte comes to power, and the rebuilding of Paris begins (1848–1852) 

King Louis-Philippe was overthrown in the February Revolution of 1848. On 10 December 1848, Louis-Napoléon Bonaparte, the nephew of Napoléon Bonaparte, won the first direct presidential elections ever held in France with an overwhelming 74.2 percent of the votes cast. He was elected largely because of his famous name, but also because of his promise to try to end poverty and improve the lives of ordinary people. Though he had been born in Paris, he had lived very little in the city; from the age of seven, he had lived in exile in Switzerland, England, and the United States, and for six years in prison in France for attempting to overthrow King Louis-Philippe. He had been especially impressed by London, with its wide streets, squares and large public parks. In 1852 he gave a public speech declaring: "Paris is the heart of France. Let us apply our efforts to embellishing this great city. Let us open new streets, make the working class quarters, which lack air and light, more healthy, and let the beneficial sunlight reach everywhere within our walls". As soon as he was President, he supported the building of the first subsidized housing project for workers in Paris, the Cité-Napoléon, on the rue Rochechouart. He proposed the completion of the rue de Rivoli from the Louvre to the Hôtel de Ville, completing the project begun by his uncle Napoléon Bonaparte, and he began a project which would transform the Bois de Boulogne (Boulogne Forest) into a large new public park, modelled after Hyde Park in London but much larger, on the west side of the city. He wanted both these projects to be completed before the end of his term in 1852, but became frustrated by the slow progress made by his prefect of the Seine, Jean-Jacques Berger. The prefect was unable to move the work forward on the rue de Rivoli quickly enough, and the original design for the Bois de Boulogne turned out to be a disaster; the architect, Jacques Ignace Hittorff, who had designed the Place de la Concorde for Louis-Philippe, followed Louis-Napoléon's instructions to imitate Hyde Park and designed two lakes connected by a stream for the new park, but forgot to take into account the difference of elevation between the two lakes. If they had been built, the one lake would have immediately emptied itself into the other.

Haussmann did not have time to finish the third phase, as he soon came under intense attack from the opponents of Napoleon III.

The downfall of Haussmann (1870) and the completion of his work (1927) 
In 1867, one of the leaders of the parliamentary opposition to Napoleon, Jules Ferry, ridiculed the accounting practices of Haussmann as Les Comptes fantastiques d'Haussmann ("The fantastic (bank) accounts of Haussmann"), a play-on-words based on the "Les Contes d'Hoffman" Offenbach operetta popular at the time. In the autumn of 1867, the voucher program was ruled as official debt by the Court of Accounts, rather than as the "deferred payments" which Haussmann argued they were. This made the voucher scheme illegal, since the City of Paris had not obtained the permission of the Legislative Assembly before borrowing. The City was forced to enter into renegotiations with the Crédit Foncier to convert the vouchers into regular debt. Two separate agreements were made with the Crédit Foncier; the city agreed to repay 465 million francs in total over 40 years and 39 years respectively. The debates in the Legislative Assembly surrounding the authorization of these new agreements lasted 11 sessions, with critics attacking Haussmann's borrowing, his questionable funding mechanisms, and the City of Paris's governing structure. The result was a new law, passed on April 18, 1868, which gave the Legislative Assembly oversight of the city's finances.

In the parliamentary elections of May 1869, the government candidates won 4.43 million votes, while the opposition republicans won 3.35 million votes. In Paris, the republican candidates won 234,000 votes to 77,000 for the Bonapartist candidates, and took eight of the nine seats of Paris deputies. At the same time Napoleon III was increasingly ill, suffering from gallstones which were to cause his death in 1873, and preoccupied by the political crisis that would lead to the Franco-Prussian War. In December 1869 Napoleon III named an opposition leader and fierce critic of Haussmann, Emile Ollivier, as his new prime minister. Napoleon gave in to the opposition demands in January 1870 and asked Haussmann to resign. Haussmann refused to resign, and the Emperor reluctantly dismissed him on 5 January 1870. Eight months later, during the Franco-Prussian War, Napoleon III was captured by the Germans, and the Empire was overthrown.

In his memoirs, written many years later, Haussmann had this comment on his dismissal: "In the eyes of the Parisians, who like routine in things but are changeable when it comes to people, I committed two great wrongs: Over the course of seventeen years, I disturbed their daily habits by turning Paris upside down, and they had to look at the same face of the Prefect in the Hotel de Ville. These were two unforgivable complaints."

Haussmann's successor as prefect of the Seine appointed Jean-Charles Adolphe Alphand, the head of Haussmann's department of parks and plantations, as the director of works of Paris. Alphand respected the basic concepts of his plan. Despite their intense criticism of Napoleon III and Haussmann during the Second Empire, the leaders of the new Third Republic continued and finished his renovation projects.
 1875: completion of the Paris Opéra
 1877: completion of the boulevard Saint-Germain
 1877: completion of the avenue de l'Opéra
 1879: completion of the boulevard Henri IV
 1889: completion of the avenue de la République
 1907: completion of the boulevard Raspail
 1927: completion of the boulevard Haussmann

Green space – parks and gardens 

Prior to Haussmann, Paris had only four public parks: the Jardin des Tuileries, the Jardin du Luxembourg, and the Palais Royal, all in the center of the city, and the Parc Monceau, the former property of the family of King Louis Philippe, in addition to the Jardin des Plantes, the city's botanical garden and oldest park. Napoleon III had already begun construction of the Bois de Boulogne, and wanted to build more new parks and gardens for the recreation and relaxation of the Parisians, particularly those in the new neighborhoods of the expanding city. Napoleon III's new parks were inspired by his memories of the parks in London, especially Hyde Park, where he had strolled and promenaded in a carriage while in exile; but he wanted to build on a much larger scale. Working with Haussmann, Jean-Charles Adolphe Alphand, the engineer who headed the new Service of Promenades and Plantations, whom Haussmann brought with him from Bordeaux, and his new chief gardener, Jean-Pierre Barillet-Deschamps, also from Bordeaux, laid out a plan for four major parks at the cardinal points of the compass around the city. Thousands of workers and gardeners began to dig lakes, build cascades, plant lawns, flowerbeds and trees. construct chalets and grottoes. Haussmann and Alphand created the Bois de Boulogne (1852–1858) to the west of Paris: the Bois de Vincennes (1860–1865) to the east; the Parc des Buttes-Chaumont (1865–1867) to the north, and Parc Montsouris (1865–1878) to the south. In addition to building the four large parks, Haussmann and Alphand redesigned and replanted the city's older parks, including Parc Monceau, and the Jardin du Luxembourg. Altogether, in seventeen years, they planted six hundred thousand trees and added two thousand hectares of parks and green space to Paris. Never before had a city built so many parks and gardens in such a short time.

Under Louis Philippe, a single public square had been created, at the tip of the Ile-de-la-Cité. Haussmann wrote in his memoirs that Napoleon III instructed him: "do not miss an opportunity to build, in all the arrondissements of Paris, the greatest possible number of squares, in order to offer the Parisians, as they have done in London, places for relaxation and recreation for all the families and all the children, rich and poor." In response Haussmann created twenty-four new squares; seventeen in the older part of the city, eleven in the new arrondissements, adding  of green space. Alphand termed these small parks "green and flowering salons." Haussmann's goal was to have one park in each of the eighty neighborhoods of Paris, so that no one was more than ten minutes' walk from such a park. The parks and squares were an immediate success with all classes of Parisians.

The architecture of Haussmann's Paris 

Napoleon III and Haussmann commissioned a wide variety of architecture, some of it traditional, some of it very innovative, like the glass and iron pavilions of Les Halles; and some of it, such as the Opéra Garnier, commissioned by Napoleon III, designed by Charles Garnier but not finished until 1875, is difficult to classify. Many of the buildings were designed by the city architect, Gabriel Davioud, who designed everything from city halls and theaters to park benches and kiosks.

His architectural projects included:
 The construction of two new railroad stations, the Gare du Nord and the Gare de l'Est; and the rebuilding of the Gare de Lyon.
 Six new mairies, or town halls, for the 1st, 2nd, 3rd, 4th, 7th and 12th arrondissements, and the enlargement of the other mairies.
 The reconstruction of Les Halles, the central market, replacing the old market buildings with large glass and iron pavilions, designed by Victor Baltard. In addition, Haussmann built a new market in the neighborhood of the Temple, the Marché Saint-Honoré; the Marché de l'Europe in the 8th arrondissement; the Marché Saint-Quentin in the 10th arrondissement; the Marché de Belleville in the 20th; the Marché des Batignolles in the 17th; the Marché Saint-Didier and Marché d'Auteuil in the 16th; the Marché de Necker in the 15th; the Marché de Montrouge in the 14th; the Marché de Place d'Italie in the 13th; the Marché Saint-Maur-Popincourt in the 11th.
 The Paris Opera (now Palais Garnier), begun under Napoleon III and finished in 1875; and five new theaters; the Châtelet and Théâtre Lyrique on the Place du Châtelet; the Gaîté, Vaudeville and Panorama.
 Five lycées were renovated, and in each of the eighty neighborhoods Haussmann established one municipal school for boys and one for girls, in addition to the large network of schools run by the Catholic church.
 The reconstruction and enlargement of the city's oldest hospital, the Hôtel-Dieu de Paris on the Île-de-la-Cité.
 The completion of the last wing of the Louvre, and the opening up of the Place du Carousel and the Place du Palais-Royal by the demolition of several old streets.
 The building of the first railroad bridge across the Seine; originally called the Pont Napoleon III, now called simply the Pont National.
Since 1801, under Napoleon I, the French government was responsible for the building and maintenance of churches. Haussmann built, renovated or purchased nineteen churches. New churches included the Saint-Augustin, the Eglise Saint-Vincent de Paul, the Eglise de la Trinité. He bought six churches which had been purchased by private individuals during the French Revolution. Haussmann built or renovated five temples and built two new synagogues, on rue des Tournelles and rue de la Victoire.

Besides building churches, theaters and other public buildings, Haussmann paid attention to the details of the architecture along the street; his city architect, Gabriel Davioud, designed garden fences, kiosks, shelters for visitors to the parks, public toilets, and dozens of other small but important structures.

The Haussmann building 

The most famous and recognizable feature of Haussmann's renovation of Paris are the Haussmann apartment buildings which line the boulevards of Paris. Street blocks were designed as homogeneous architectural wholes. He treated buildings not as independent structures, but as pieces of a unified urban landscape.

In 18th-century Paris, buildings were usually narrow (often only six meters wide [20 feet]); deep (sometimes forty meters; 130 feet) and tall—as many as five or six stories. The ground floor usually contained a shop, and the shopkeeper lived in the rooms above the shop. The upper floors were occupied by families; the top floor, under the roof, was originally a storage place, but under the pressure of the growing population, was usually turned into a low-cost residence. In the early 19th century, before Haussmann, the height of buildings was strictly limited to 22.41 meters (73 ft 6 in), or four floors above the ground floor. The city also began to see a demographic shift; wealthier families began moving to the western neighborhoods, partly because there was more space, and partly because the prevailing winds carried the smoke from the new factories in Paris toward the east.

In Haussmann's Paris, the streets became much wider, growing from an average of twelve meters (39 ft) wide to twenty-four meters (79 ft), and in the new arrondissements, often to eighteen meters (59 ft) wide.

The interiors of the buildings were left to the owners of the buildings, but the façades were strictly regulated, to ensure that they were the same height, color, material, and general design, and were harmonious when all seen together.

The reconstruction of the rue de Rivoli was the model for the rest of the Paris boulevards. The new apartment buildings followed the same general plan:
 ground floor and basement with thick, load-bearing walls, fronts usually parallel to the street. This was often occupied by shops or offices.
 mezzanine or entresol intermediate level, with low ceilings; often also used by shops or offices.
 second, piano nobile floor with a balcony. This floor, in the days before elevators were common, was the most desirable floor, and had the largest and best apartments.
 third and fourth floors in the same style but with less elaborate stonework around the windows, sometimes lacking balconies.
 fifth floor with a single, continuous, undecorated balcony.
 mansard roof, angled at 45°, with garret rooms and dormer windows. Originally this floor was to be occupied by lower-income tenants, but with time and with higher rents it came to be occupied almost exclusively by the concierges and servants of the people in the apartments below.

The Haussmann façade was organized around horizontal lines that often continued from one building to the next: balconies and cornices were perfectly aligned without any noticeable alcoves or projections, at the risk of the uniformity of certain quarters. The rue de Rivoli served as a model for the entire network of new Parisian boulevards. For the building façades, the technological progress of stone sawing and (steam) transportation allowed the use of massive stone blocks instead of simple stone facing. The street-side result was a "monumental" effect that exempted buildings from a dependence on decoration; sculpture and other elaborate stonework would not become widespread until the end of the century.

Before Haussmann, most buildings in Paris were made of brick or wood and covered with plaster. Haussmann required that the buildings along the new boulevards be either built or faced with cut stone, usually the local cream-colored Lutetian limestone, which gave more harmony to the appearance of the boulevards. He also required, using a decree from 1852, that the façades of all buildings be regularly maintained, repainted, or cleaned, at least every ten years. under the threat of a fine of one hundred francs.

Underneath the streets of Haussmann's Paris – the renovation of the city's infrastructure 

While he was rebuilding the boulevards of Paris, Haussmann simultaneously rebuilt the dense labyrinth of pipes, sewers and tunnels under the streets which provided Parisians with basic services. Haussmann wrote in his mémoires: "The underground galleries are an organ of the great city, functioning like an organ of the human body, without seeing the light of day; clean and fresh water, light and heat circulate like the various fluids whose movement and maintenance serves the life of the body; the secretions are taken away mysteriously and don't disturb the good functioning of the city and without spoiling its beautiful exterior."

Haussmann began with the water supply. Before Haussmann, drinking water in Paris was either lifted by steam engines from the Seine, or brought by a canal, started by Napoleon I, from the river Ourcq, a tributary of the river Marne. The quantity of water was insufficient for the fast-growing city, and, since the sewers also emptied into the Seine near the intakes for drinking water, it was also notoriously unhealthy. In March 1855 Haussmann appointed Eugène Belgrand, a graduate of the École Polytechnique, to the post of Director of Water and Sewers of Paris.

Belgrand first addressed the city's fresh water needs, constructing a system of aqueducts that nearly doubled the amount of water available per person per day and quadrupled the number of homes with running water. These aqueducts discharged their water in reservoirs situated within the city. Inside the city limits and opposite Parc Montsouris, Belgrand built the largest water reservoir in the world to hold the water from the River Vanne.

At the same time Belgrand began rebuilding the water distribution and sewer system under the streets. In 1852 Paris had  of sewers, which could carry only liquid waste. Containers of solid waste were picked up each night by people called vidangeurs, who carried it to waste dumps on the outskirts of the city. The tunnels he designed were intended to be clean, easily accessible, and substantially larger than the previous Parisian underground. Under his guidance, Paris's sewer system expanded fourfold between 1852 and 1869.

Haussmann and Belgrand built new sewer tunnels under each sidewalk of the new boulevards. The sewers were designed to be large enough to evacuate rain water immediately; the large amount of water used to wash the city streets; waste water from both industries and individual households; and water that collected in basements when the level of the Seine was high. The new tunnels were 2.3 meters (7 ft 6 in) high and 1.3 meters (4 ft 3 in) wide, large enough for men to work standing up. A channel down the center of the tunnel carried away the waste water, with sidewalks on either side for the égoutiers, or sewer workers. Specially designed wagons and boats moved on rails up and down the channels, cleaning them. Belgrand proudly invited tourists to visit his sewers and ride in the boats under the streets of the city.

The underground labyrinth built by Haussmann also provided gas for heat and for lights to illuminate Paris. At the beginning of the Second Empire, gas was provided by six different private companies. Haussmann forced them to consolidate into a single company, the Compagnie parisienne d'éclairage et de chauffage par le gaz, with rights to provide gas to Parisians for fifty years. Consumption of gas tripled between 1855 and 1859. In 1850 there were only 9000 gaslights in Paris; by 1867, the Paris Opera and four other major theaters alone had fifteen thousand gas lights. Almost all the new residential buildings of Paris had gaslights in the courtyards and stairways; the monuments and public buildings of Paris, the arcades of the Rue de Rivoli, and the squares, boulevards and streets were illuminated at night by gaslights. For the first time, Paris was the City of Light.

Critics of Haussmann's Paris

Contemporaneous 

Haussmann's renovation of Paris had many critics during his own time. Some were simply tired of the continuous construction. The French historian Léon Halévy wrote in 1867, "the work of Monsieur Haussmann is incomparable. Everyone agrees. Paris is a marvel, and M. Haussmann has done in fifteen years what a century could not have done. But that's enough for the moment. There will be a 20th century. Let's leave something for them to do." Others regretted that he had destroyed a historic part of the city. The brothers Goncourt condemned the avenues that cut at right angles through the center of the old city, where "one could no longer feel in the world of Balzac." Jules Ferry, the most vocal critic of Haussmann in the French parliament, wrote: "We weep with our eyes full of tears for the old Paris, the Paris of Voltaire, of Desmoulins, the Paris of 1830 and 1848, when we see the grand and intolerable new buildings, the costly confusion, the triumphant vulgarity, the awful materialism, that we are going to pass on to our descendants."

Later era 

The 20th century historian of Paris René Héron de Villefosse shared: "in less than twenty years, Paris lost its ancestral appearance, its character which passed from generation to generation... the picturesque and charming ambiance which our fathers had passed onto us was demolished, often without good reason." Héron de Villefosse denounced Haussmann's central market, Les Halles, as "a hideous eruption" of cast iron. Describing Haussmann's renovation of the Île de la Cité, he wrote: "the old ship of Paris was torpedoed by Baron Haussmann and sunk during his reign. It was perhaps the greatest crime of the megalomaniac prefect and also his biggest mistake...His work caused more damage than a hundred bombings. It was in part necessary, and one should give him credit for his self-confidence, but he was certainly lacking culture and good taste...In the United States, it would be wonderful, but in our capital, which he covered with barriers, scaffolds, gravel, and dust for twenty years, he committed crimes, errors, and showed bad taste."

The Paris historian, Patrice de Moncan, in general an admirer of Haussmann's work, faulted Haussmann for not preserving more of the historic streets on the Île de la Cité, and for clearing a large open space in front of the Cathedral of Notre Dame, while hiding another major historical monument, Sainte-Chapelle, out of sight within the walls of the Palais de Justice, He also criticized Haussmann for reducing the Jardin de Luxembourg from thirty to twenty-six hectares in order to build the rues Medici, Guynemer and Auguste-Comte; for giving away a half of Parc Monceau to the Pereire brothers for building lots, in order to reduce costs; and for destroying several historic residences along the route of the Boulevard Saint-Germain, because of his unwavering determination to have straight streets.

The debate about the military purposes of Haussmann's boulevards 

Some of Haussmann's critics said that the real purpose of Haussmann's boulevards was to make it easier for the army to manoeuver and suppress armed uprisings; Paris had experienced six such uprisings between 1830 and 1848, all in the narrow, crowded streets in the center and east of Paris and on the left bank around the Pantheon. These critics argued that a small number of large, open intersections allowed easy control by a small force. In addition, buildings set back from the center of the street could not be used so easily as fortifications. Emile Zola repeated that argument in his early novel, La Curée; "Paris sliced by strokes of a saber: the veins opened, nourishing one hundred thousand earth movers and stone masons; criss-crossed by admirable strategic routes, placing forts in the heart of the old neighborhoods.

Some real-estate owners demanded large, straight avenues to help troops manoeuvre. The argument that the boulevards were designed for troop movements was repeated by 20th century critics, including the French historian, René Hérron de Villefosse, who wrote, "the larger part of the piercing of avenues had for its reason the desire to avoid popular insurrections and barricades. They were strategic from their conception." This argument was also popularized by the American architectural critic, Lewis Mumford.

Haussmann himself did not deny the military value of the wider streets. In his memoires, he wrote that his new boulevard Sebastopol resulted in the "gutting of old Paris, of the quarter of riots and barricades." He admitted he sometimes used this argument with the Parliament to justify the high cost of his projects, arguing that they were for national defense and should be paid for, at least partially, by the state. He wrote: "But, as for me, I who was the promoter of these additions made to the original project, I declare that I never thought in the least, in adding them, of their greater or lesser strategic value." The Paris urban historian Patrice de Moncan wrote: "To see the works created by Haussmann and Napoleon III only from the perspective of their strategic value is very reductive. The Emperor was a convinced follower of Saint-Simon. His desire to make Paris, the economic capital of France, a more open, more healthy city, not only for the upper classes but also for the workers, cannot be denied, and should be recognised as the primary motivation."

There was only one armed uprising in Paris after Haussmann, the Paris Commune from March through May 1871, and the boulevards played no important role. The Communards seized power easily, because the French Army was absent, defeated and captured by the Prussians. The Communards took advantage of the boulevards to build a few large forts of paving stones with wide fields of fire at strategic points, such as the meeting point of the Rue de Rivoli and Place de la Concorde. But when the newly organized army arrived at the end of May, it avoided the main boulevards, advanced slowly and methodically to avoid casualties, worked its way around the barricades, and took them from behind. The Communards were defeated in one week not because of Haussmann's boulevards, but because they were outnumbered by five to one, they had fewer weapons and fewer people trained to use them, they had no hope of getting support from outside Paris, they had no plan for the defense of the city; they had very few experienced officers; there was no single commander; and each neighborhood was left to defend itself.

As Paris historian Patrice de Moncan observed, most of Haussmann's projects had little or no strategic or military value; the purpose of building new sewers, aqueducts, parks, hospitals, schools, city halls, theaters, churches, markets and other public buildings was, as Haussmann stated, to employ thousands of workers, and to make the city more healthy, less congested, and more beautiful.

Social disruption 

Haussmann was also blamed for the social disruption caused by his gigantic building projects. Thousands of families and businesses had to relocate when their buildings were demolished for the construction of the new boulevards. Haussmann was also blamed for the dramatic increase in rents, which increased by three hundred percent during the Second Empire, while wages, except for those of construction workers, remained flat, and blamed for the enormous amount of speculation in the real estate market. He was also blamed for reducing the amount of housing available for low income families, forcing low-income Parisians to move from the center to the outer neighborhoods of the city, where rents were lower. Statistics showed that the population of the first and sixth arrondissements, where some of the most densely populated neighborhoods were located, dropped, while the population of the new 17th and 20th arrondissements, on the edges of the city, grew rapidly.

Haussmann's defenders noted that he built far more buildings than he tore down: he demolished 19,730 buildings, containing 120,000 lodgings or apartments, while building 34,000 new buildings, with 215,300 new apartments and lodgings. French historian Michel Cremona wrote that, even with the increase in population, from 949,000 Parisians in 1850 to 1,130,500 in 1856, to two million in 1870, including those in the newly annexed eight arrondissements around the city, the number of housing units grew faster than the population.

Recent studies have also shown that the proportion of Paris housing occupied by low-income Parisians did not decrease under Haussmann, and that the poor were not driven out of Paris by Haussmann's renovation. In 1865 a survey by the prefecture of Paris showed that 780,000 Parisians, or 42 percent of the population, did not pay taxes due to their low income. Another 330,000 Parisians or 17 percent, paid less than 250 francs a month rent. Thirty-two percent of the Paris housing was occupied by middle-class families, paying rent between 250 and 1500 francs. Fifty thousand Parisians were classified as rich, with rents over 1500 francs a month, and occupied just three percent of the residences.

Other critics blamed Haussmann for the division of Paris into rich and poor neighborhoods, with the poor concentrated in the east and the middle class and wealthy in the west. Haussmann's defenders noted that this shift in population had been underway since the 1830s, long before Haussmann, as more prosperous Parisians moved to the western neighborhoods, where there was more open space, and where residents benefited from the prevailing winds, which carried the smoke from Paris's new industries toward the east. His defenders also noted that Napoleon III and Haussmann made a special point to build an equal number of new boulevards, new sewers, water supplies, hospitals, schools, squares, parks and gardens in the working class eastern arrondissements as they did in the western neighborhoods.

A form of vertical stratification did take place in the Paris population due to Haussmann's renovations. Prior to Haussmann, Paris buildings usually had wealthier people on the second floor (the "etage noble"), while middle class and lower-income tenants occupied the top floors. Under Haussmann, with the increase in rents and greater demand for housing, low-income people were unable to afford the rents for the upper floors; the top floors were increasingly occupied by concierges and the servants of those in the floors below. Lower-income tenants were forced to the outer neighborhoods, where rents were lower.

Legacy 

The Baron Haussmann's transformations to Paris improved the quality of life in the capital. Disease epidemics (save tuberculosis) ceased, traffic circulation improved and new buildings were better-built and more functional than their predecessors.

The Second Empire renovations left such a mark on Paris' urban history that all subsequent trends and influences were forced to refer to, adapt to, or reject, or to reuse some of its elements. By intervening only once in Paris's ancient districts, pockets of insalubrity remained which explain the resurgence of both hygienic ideals and radicalness of some planners of the 20th century.

The end of "pure Haussmannism" can be traced to urban legislation of 1882 and 1884 that ended the uniformity of the classical street, by permitting staggered façades and the first creativity for roof-level architecture; the latter would develop greatly after restrictions were further liberalized by a 1902 law. All the same, this period was merely "post-Haussmann", rejecting only the austerity of the Napoleon-era architecture, without questioning the urban planning itself.

A century after Napoleon III's reign, new housing needs and the rise of a new voluntarist Fifth Republic began a new era of Parisian urbanism. The new era rejected Haussmannian ideas as a whole to embrace those represented by architects such as Le Corbusier in abandoning unbroken street-side façades, limitations of building size and dimension, and even closing the street itself to automobiles with the creation of separated, car-free spaces between the buildings for pedestrians. This new model was quickly brought into question by the 1970s, a period featuring a reemphasis of the Haussmann heritage: a new promotion of the multifunctional street was accompanied by limitations of the building model and, in certain quarters, by an attempt to rediscover the architectural homogeneity of the Second Empire street-block.

Certain Parisian suburban towns, for example Issy-les-Moulineaux and Puteaux, have built new quarters that even by their name "Quartier Haussmannien", claim the Haussmannian heritage. The Belgian capital Brussels also followed suit at the end of the same century and conducted an extensive (but smaller scale compared to Paris) demolition and renovation, carving out new central boulevards that were straight lined and flanked by Haussmann style row of apartments.

See also 
 Demographics of Paris
 Hobrecht-Plan, a similar urban planning approach in Berlin conducted by James Hobrecht, created in 1853

References 
 Attribution
 Portions of this article have been translated from its equivalent in the French language Wikipedia.

Notes and citations

Bibliography 
 Carmona, Michel, and Patrick Camiller. Haussmann: His Life and Times and the Making of Modern Paris (2002)
 Centre des monuments nationaux. Le guide du patrimoine en France (Éditions du patrimoine, 2002), 
 de Moncan, Patrice. Le Paris d'Haussmann (Les Éditions du Mécène, 2012), 
 de Moncan, Patrice. Les jardins du Baron Haussmann (Les Éditions du Mécène, 2007), 
 Jarrassé, Dominique. Grammaire des jardins Parisiens (Parigramme, 2007), 
 Jones, Colin. Paris: Biography of a City (2004)
 Kirkland, Stephane. Paris Reborn: Napoléon III, Baron Haussmann, and the Quest to Build a Modern City (St. Martin's Press, 2013),
 Maneglier, Hervé. Paris Impérial. La vie quotidienne sous le Second Empire (2009), Armand Colin, Paris
 Milza, Pierre. Napoleon III (Perrin, 2006), 
 Pinkney, David H. Napoleon III and the Rebuilding of Paris (Princeton University Press, 1958)
 Weeks, Willet. The Man Who Made Paris: The Illustrated Biography of Georges-Eugène Haussmann (2000)

Further reading 
 Hopkins, Richard S. Planning the Greenspaces of Nineteenth-Century Paris (LSU Press, 2015).
 Paccoud, Antoine. "Planning law, power, and practice: Haussmann in Paris (1853–1870)". Planning Perspectives 31.3 (2016): 341–61.
 Pinkney, David H. "Napoleon III's Transformation of Paris: The Origins and Development of the Idea", Journal of Modern History (1955) 27#2 pp. 125–34. .
 Pinkney, David H. "Money and Politics in the Rebuilding of Paris, 1860–1870", Journal of Economic History (1957) 17#1 pp. 45–61. .
 Richardson, Joanna. "Emperor of Paris Baron Haussmann 1809–1891", History Today (1975), 25#12 pp. 843–49.
 Saalman, Howard. Haussmann: Paris Transformed (G. Braziller, 1971).
 Soppelsa, Peter S. The Fragility of Modernity: Infrastructure and Everyday Life in Paris, 1870–1914 (ProQuest, 2009).
 Walker, Nathaniel Robert. "Lost in the City of Light: Dystopia and Utopia in the Wake of Haussmann's Paris". Utopian Studies 25.1 (2014): 23–51. . .

External links 

History of Paris

Urban planning in France
19th century in Paris
City plans